The Way That You Love Me may refer to:

"The Way That You Love Me" (Vera Blue song), 2019
"(It's Just) The Way That You Love Me", a 1988 song by Paula Abdul